In molecular biology, the archease''' superfamily of proteins are represented in all three domains of life. Archease genes are generally located adjacent to genes encoding proteins involved in DNA or RNA processing and therefore been predicted to be modulators or chaperones involved in DNA or RNA metabolism. Many of the roles of archeases remain to be established experimentally.

The function of one of the archeases from the hyperthermophile Pyrococcus abyssi has been determined. The gene encoding the archease (PAB1946) is located in a bicistronic operon immediately upstream from a second open reading frame (PAB1947), which encodes a tRNA m5C methyltransferase. The methyl transferase catalyses m5C formation at several cytosine's within tRNAs with preference for C49; the specificity of the methyltransferase reaction being increased by the archease. The archease exists in monomeric and oligomeric states, with only the oligomeric forms able to bind the methyltransferase. Binding prevents aggregation and hinders dimerisation of the methyltransferase-tRNA complex.

The function of this family of archeases as chaperones is supported by structural analysis of the archease from Methanobacterium thermoautotrophicum'', which shows homology to heat shock protein 33, a chaperone protein that inhibits the aggregation of partially denatured proteins.

References

Protein domains